The Meizu M6 Note is a smartphone designed and produced by the Chinese manufacturer Meizu, which runs on Flyme OS, Meizu's modified Android operating system. It is the company's latest model of M series.

There is an improved variant, named M6s, it has a 5.7 inch display (and more specs).

See also
 Meizu
 Meizu M3 Max
 Meizu M5

References

External links
 Official product page Meizu

Mobile phones introduced in 2017
Meizu smartphones
Discontinued smartphones